The Aerodyne Totem Bi (English: Biplace or two-seater) is a French two-place, paraglider that was designed by Michel Le Blanc and produced by Aerodyne Technologies of Talloires.

Design and development
The Totem Bi was designed as a two-place paraglider for flight training.

The glider is AFNOR Biplace certified.

Specifications (Totem Bi)

References

Totem Bi
Paragliders